Life After Life is a 2022 British television adaptation by playwright Bash Doran of the 2013 novel Life After Life by Kate Atkinson. It follows the story of Ursula Todd, a woman in the first half of the 20th century who experiences an endless cycle of birth, death and rebirth.

Background 
The BBC commissioned a four-part adaptation of the novel Life After Life in December 2020. In April 2021, it was announced that Thomasin McKenzie and Sian Clifford would star in the series alongside James McArdle, Jessica Brown Findlay, and Jessica Hynes with Patsy Ferran, Harry Michell, Laurie Kynaston, Joshua Hill, and Maria Laird completing the cast. The series began broadcast on 19 April 2022 on BBC Two and BBC iPlayer.

Cast

Main

Recurring

Episodes

Reception 
A review in The Guardian described the series as an appealing, emotional drama but somewhat lacking in overall narrative and resolution commenting that "The show's main priority is apparent from the start: making people cry. If you like the feeling of being overwhelmed by vicarious trauma and grief then you're in for a treat. And the anguish is thoroughly addictive. It's what makes Life After Life incredibly compelling, binge-worthy even, despite being practically plotless from one episode to the next." Another review in The Telegraph praised the adaptation's truthfulness to the original story describing it as a "gorgeously-realised and entirely faithful adaptation of Kate Atkinson’s 2013 bestseller."

A Radio Times review was complimentary of the series summarising that "Life After Life combines much of what appeals to British viewing audiences – a rose-tinted English countryside of old, a wartime setting, a stellar cast – but with its mind-bending, time-looping twist, it is entirely its own beast." A mixed review by Gerard Gilbert on iNews described the drama as "overcomplicated" but concluded that the "handsome production was bolstered by strong performances. The first episode eventually overcame its tricky structure to suggest that there might yet be life in Life After Life."

References

External links 
 

2022 British television series debuts
2022 British television series endings
2020s British drama television series
2020s British television miniseries
Television series set in the 1910s
Television series set in the 1920s
Television series set in the 1930s
World War II television drama series
2020s British science fiction television series
World War I television drama series
Television shows set in Buckinghamshire
Television shows set in London
Television shows set in Bavaria
Television shows set in Berlin
Television series about children
Television series about teenagers
Television series about families